The Reverend Noadiah Russell (22 July 1659 – 3 December 1713) was a Congregationalist minister, a founder and trustee of Yale College, and one of the framers of the Saybrook Platform.

Life
Russell was born in New Haven, Connecticut, the son of William Russell, who emigrated from England in 1638, and his wife Sarah Davis. His father died in 1665. His will requested that his "son be devoted to God in the way of learning, being likely to prove a useful instrument in the good work of the ministry." Noadiah was graduated from Harvard in 1681,  and became a teacher. He was ordained at Middletown on 24 October 1688.

Along with his cousin, Samuel Russell, he was one of the ten founders of Yale in 1701 and a trustee of Yale College from 1701 to 1713.

Russell married Mary Hamlin, daughter of Captain Giles Hamlin and Hester Crow Hamlin, on 20 February 1689/90 at Middletown, Connecticut. They had nine children. Their eldest son Rev. William Russell, graduated from Yale in 1709, and his wife Mary Pierpont, daughter of another Yale founder, Rev. James Pierpont, were parents of another Reverend Noadiah Russell.

Russell was pastor of the First Congregational Church in Middletown, Connecticut, for 25 years, until his death.  He was succeeded as pastor by his son, William.  Russell was buried in Riverside Cemetery in Middletown.

Noadiah Russell was a progenitor of William Huntington Russell, Frank Henry Russell, and Frank Ford Russell.

References

Yale University founders
1659 births
1713 deaths
Harvard University alumni
17th-century Congregationalist ministers
18th-century Congregationalist ministers
People of colonial Connecticut
American Congregationalist ministers
American people of English descent
Religious leaders from New Haven, Connecticut
Burials in Connecticut
18th-century American clergy